{{DISPLAYTITLE:C10H16O}}
The molecular formula C10H16O (molar mass: 152.24 g/mol) may refer to:

 Camphor
 Carveol
 Citral, or the related neral or gerania
 (E,E)-2,4-Decadienal
 Fenchone
 (S)-Ipsdienol
 Myrtenol
 Perillyl alcohol
 Piperitone
 Pulegone
 Thujone
 Verbenol